Samuel M. Garland (November 15, 1812  – 1880) was a nineteenth-century lawyer and political figure from Virginia.  Garland was the Clerk of Court for Amherst County and was elected to the Virginia Constitutional Convention of 1850 and the Virginia Secession Convention of 1861.

Early life
Garland was born on Kinmore Plantation in Amherst County, Virginia in 1812. He graduated from the College of William and Mary in 1824-25.

Career

As an adult, Garland studied law and established a practice in Amherst County. He was Clerk of the Court there from 1830 until 1864, serving then under the Confederate regime. He was a lay reader in the Protestant Episcopal Church.  
 
In 1850, Garland was elected to the Virginia Constitutional Convention of 1850. He was one of four delegates elected from the central Piedmont delegate district made up of Amherst County, and neighboring Nelson and Albemarle Counties.

Garland served in the Virginia Secession Convention of 1861. A secessionist, he voted for secession before Lincoln’s call up of Virginia militia to restore Federal property.

Death
Samuel M. Garland died in Amherst County, Virginia in 1880.

References

Bibliography

1812 births
1880 deaths
County officials in Virginia
Anglican lay readers
People from Amherst County, Virginia